The 2013 Albany Panthers season was the fourth season as a professional indoor football franchise and their second in the Professional Indoor Football League (PIFL). The 2013 season ended up being the final season for the Panthers, who lost their lease at the James H. Gray Civic Center following the season. One of 7 teams competing in the PIFL for the 2013 season.

The team played their home games under head coach Lucious Davis at the James H. Gray Civic Center in Albany, Georgia. The Panthers earned a 7-5 record, placing 4th in the league.

Schedule
Key:

Regular season
All start times are local to home team

Postseason

Roster

Division Standings

References

External links
2013 Results

Albany Panthers
Albany Panthers
Albany Panthers